VMC may refer to:

Education
 Van Mildert College, Durham, a constituent college of Durham University, England
 Vincent Massey Collegiate (Montreal), a high school in Montreal, Quebec, Canada
 Government Vellore Medical College, a medical college in Adukkamparai, Vellore, Tamil Nadu, India

Organisations
 Valencian Media Corporation, a Spanish media company
 Vellore Municipal Corporation, the civic body that governs the city of Vellore, Tamil Nadu, India
 Vijayawada Municipal Corporation, the civic body that governs the city of Vijayawada, Andhra Pradesh, India
 Virgin Mobile Canada, a mobile brand wholly owned by Bell Mobility in Canada
 Vruwink MotorCycles, a Sidecarcross frame manufacturer
 Vulcan Materials Company, a producer of construction materials

Technology
 Variational Monte Carlo, an algorithm for approximating the ground state of a quantum system
 Vista Media Center, the Windows Media Center included with Windows Vista
 Visual Monitoring Camera, a camera launched aboard Mars Express, a spacecraft in orbit of Mars

Transportation
 VMC, the minimum control speed(s) of a multi-engine aircraft
 Visual meteorological conditions, an aviation flight category in which visual flight rules flight is permitted
 Vaughan Metropolitan Centre station, a Toronto Transit Commission subway station, Canada
 Vevey–Montreux–Chillon–Villeneuve tramway, a former tramway in the Swiss canton of Vaud

Other
 Vaughan Metropolitan Centre, a central business district in Vaughan, Ontario
 Vincent-McCall Company Building, now the VMC Lofts, a historical site in Kenosha, Wisconsin
 Vasomotor center, a portion of the medulla oblongata that regulates blood pressure and other homeostatic processes
 Virtual Museum of Canada, Canada's national virtual museum
 My Little Pony: A Very Minty Christmas, a direct-to-DVD animated film